Nygmia solitaria is a moth of the family Erebidae. It is found in Sumatra, Peninsular Malaysia and Borneo.

Larvae have been reared on Dendropthoe pentandra.

External links
The Moths of Borneo

Lymantriinae
Moths described in 1928